Hidden Treasures Dabur Vatika Shampoo Miss Nepal 2022, the 27th Miss Nepal beauty pageant which will be held on 18 June 2022 in Lalitpur, Nepal.
During the coronation night, three winners will be crowned by Miss World Nepal 2020 Namrata Shrestha, Miss Earth Nepal 2020 Supriya Shrestha and  Miss International Nepal 2020 Sandhya Sharma.

In addition, the winners received Rs 250,000 as prize money for winning the title. The auditions of Miss Nepal will be held from 22 April to 10 May in  7 Provinces of Nepal including Birgunj, Dhangadhi, Dharan, Nepalgunj, Pokhara, Surkhet and Kathmandu.

Kantipur Television broadcast the pageant live for the Nepalese at home and abroad.

The Top 3 winners of 2022 crowned their successors: Miss Nepal World 2020 Namrata Shrestha crowned Priyanka Rani Joshi as Miss Nepal World 2022, Miss Nepal Earth 2020 Supriya Shrestha crowned Sareesha Shrestha as Miss Nepal Earth 2022 and Miss Nepal International 2020 Sandhya Sharma crowned Nancy Khadka as Miss Nepal International 2022.

Results

Placements
Color key

The Big 5 main titles were awarded in the following order:

Judges 

 Ms Anushka Shrestha - Winner of Miss Nepal 2019 and Top 12 Finalist in Miss World 2019
 Mr Bhushan Chand - Former Lieutenant General
 Ms Niti Shah - Miss International Nepal 2017
 Dr. Balram Pathak - Chairman of Rastriya Banijya Bank
 Mrs Poonam Ghimire - Winner of Miss Nepal 1996
 Mr Kishor Maharjan - Chairman of Star Hospital Limited
 Ms Lakpa Wangmo Tamang - Miss Tamang 2013 and Miss Talent Winner in Miss Nepal 2014
 Mr Deepak Thapa - Nepal's Sports Personality 2017 and Secretary General of Kathmandu Badminton Academy
 Mrs Ayasha Shrestha - Three-time Gold Medallist for Taekwondo at the South Asian Games
 Mr Nischal Basnet - Nepali film director
 Ms Lemi Tamang - Make-up Artist

Contestants

Previous pageants 
 Ashra Shrestha competed in Miss Asia Pacific International Nepal 2019.
 Sriya Gajurel was the winner of Miss Nepal North America 2019.
 Sareesha Shrestha was winner of Nepal’s Fashion Icon 2017, Miss Rotaract 2019 and Miss Newa 2018.
 Susmita Bogati was the 1st Runner-Up of Miss Nepal Peace 2074. 
 Nancy Khadka was the 4th Runner-Up of Miss Universe Nepal 2020. 
 Ashmita Dhungana was the winner of Miss Landscapes Nepal 2019.
 Ashmita Dhungana competed in Miss Grand Nepal 2019.

References

External links

Beauty pageants in Nepal
2022 beauty pageants
2022 in Nepal
Miss Nepal